Simone Kues (born 8 November 1976) is a German 1.0 point national wheelchair basketball player who plays in the wheelchair basketball league for Hamburg SV.  She joined the national team, and participated in the 2004 Summer Paralympics in Athens, at which the German team came fourth. She won bronze at the World Wheelchair Basketball Championships in Amsterdam in 2006. Her team were won the European championship in 2005, 2007 and 2009. She won a silver medal at the 2008 Summer Paralympics in Beijing.  The women's national team were voted Team of the Year in disabled sports in 2008, and President Horst Köhler awarded them the Silver Laurel Leaf, Germany's highest German sports award.

Biography
Kues was born in Einbeck in Lower Saxony on 8 November 1976. That same year she had a riding accident in Ireland, which resulted in paralysis. After rehab, she began studying psychology in Göttingen in 1998, and then devoted herself to her sport career. She graduated in 2007, and now works as a psychologist at the 's paraplegic centre.

Kues first played wheelchair basketball at the rehab clinic. She went on to play for ASC Göttingen, then with RBV Lüneburg, and finally with SV Hamburg. She joined the national team, and participated in the 2004 Summer Paralympics in Athens, at which the German team came fourth. She won bronze at the World Wheelchair Basketball Championships in Amsterdam in 2006. Her team won the European championship in 2005, 2007 and 2009, and a silver medal at the 2008 Summer Paralympics in Beijing. The women's national team were voted Team of the Year in disabled sports in 2008, and President Horst Köhler awarded them the Silver Laurel Leaf, Germany's highest German sports award.

In June 2014, Kues rejoined the senior women's team for the 2014 Women's World Wheelchair Basketball Championship in Toronto, Canada. The German team won silver after being defeated by Canada in the final.  The German team  beat the Netherlands in the 2015 European Championships, to claim its tenth European title. At the 2016 Paralympic Games, it won silver after losing the final to the United States.

Achievements
 2005: Gold at European championship (Villeneuve d'Ascq, France)
 2006: Bronze World Championship (Amsterdam, Netherlands)
 2007: Gold European Championship (Wetzlar, Germany)
 2008: Silver 2008 Summer Paralympics (Beijing, China)
 2009: Gold European Championship (Stoke Mandeville, England)
 2010: Silver at the World Championships (Birmingham, England)
2014: Silver at the World Championships (Toronto, Canada)
 2015: Gold at the European Championships (Worcester, England) 
 2016: Silver at the Paralympic Games (Rio de Janeiro, Brazil)

Awards
 2008: Silver Laurel Leaf

Notes

External links
 

German women's wheelchair basketball players
Paralympic wheelchair basketball players of Germany
Wheelchair basketball players at the 2004 Summer Paralympics
Wheelchair basketball players at the 2008 Summer Paralympics
Paralympic silver medalists for Germany
1976 births
Living people
Recipients of the Silver Laurel Leaf
Medalists at the 2008 Summer Paralympics
Wheelchair basketball players at the 2016 Summer Paralympics
Medalists at the 2016 Summer Paralympics
Paralympic medalists in wheelchair basketball
People from Einbeck
Sportspeople from Lower Saxony